Saint Thietmar (Dietmar, Thiemo) of Minden was bishop of Minden from 1185 or 1186 until his death in 1206.  According to tradition, Thietmar was from Bavaria.

It was Thietmar's custom to eat only bread and water, although this practice physically weakened him. A miracle recorded of him states that one day, when water from the well was brought to him by a servant, it had become wine. The bishop rejected the wine and asked for water again. When he received wine again, Thietmar began to distrust his servant. The bishop accompanied the servant to the well. When the servant scooped up water, it again transformed itself into wine.

References

External links

 Dietmar von Minden

 

German Roman Catholic saints
1206 deaths
Roman Catholic Prince-Bishops of Minden
Year of birth unknown
12th-century Roman Catholic bishops in the Holy Roman Empire